The 566th Intelligence Squadron is a support unit to the Aerospace Data Facility in conjunction with the Buckley Garrison, Buckley Space Force Base, Colorado. The 566th is part of the 544th Intelligence, Surveillance and Reconnaissance Group, headquartered at Buckley Space Force Base, Colorado.

The squadron's mission is to provide the Aerospace Data Facility-Colorado with information and technical support in the performance of joint national system missions.

History
The 566th Information Operations Squadron (IOS) began during World War II, when the 16th Photographic Technical Unit was activated on 5 November 1944, at Charleroi, Belgium.  The 16th was a squadron to the 67th Tactical Reconnaissance Group and the 16th was assigned to several bases in Europe: Vogelsang, Limburg, and Eschwege, Germany, and France. After World War II, the unit moved to MacDill Field, Florida, where it was decommissioned on 21 December 1945.  The 66th Reconnaissance Technical Squadron was Constituted on 15 November 1952 and Activated on 1 January 1953 at Shaw AFB. SC relocated to Shaw AFB, SC: 1 Jan–25 June 1953; Sembach AB, West Germany on 7 July 1953 and moved to Kaiserslautern, West Germany on 13 August 1953 till the unit was Inactivated on 8 February 1958. While the unit was inactive the 66th Reconnaissance Technical Squadron was Consolidated on 16 October 1984 and the New Unit was designated as the 16th Reconnaissance Technical Squadron.

The unit remained inactive until 7 September 1993, when the 16th Intelligence Squadron was activated at Buckley Air National Guard Base, Colorado. The unit was re-designated the 566th Operations Support Squadron (OSS) on 1 October 1995. Renamed later as the 566th Information Operations Squadron (IOS) on 1 August 2000, this unit aided Buckley in its transition from an Air National Guard base to an active duty Air Force base.

Lineage
 16th Photographic Technical Unit
 Constituted as the 16th Photographic Technical Unit and activated on 5 November 1944
 Inactivated on 21 December 1945
 Consolidated with the 66th Reconnaissance Technical Squadron on 16 October 1984 as the 16th Reconnaissance Technical Squadron

 66th Reconnaissance Technical Squadron
 Constituted as the 66th Reconnaissance Technical Squadron on 15 November 1952
 Activated on 1 January 1953
 Inactivated on 8 February 1958
 Consolidated with the 16th Photographic Technical Unit on 16 October 1984 as the 16th Reconnaissance Technical Squadron

 16th (566th) Intelligence Squadron
 Redesignated 16th Intelligence Squadron on 3 September 1993
 Activated on 7 September 1993
 Redesignated 566th Operations Support Squadron on 1 October 1995
 Redesignated 566th Information Operations Squadron on 1 August 2000
 Redesignated 566th Intelligence Squadron on 1 April 2007

Assignments
 67th Tactical Reconnaissance Group, 5 November 1944 – 21 December 1945
 66th Tactical Reconnaissance Wing, 1 January 1953 – 8 February 1958
 544th Intelligence Group (later 544th Information Operations Group, 544th Intelligence Group, 544th Intelligence, Surveillance and Reconnaissance Group), 7 September 1993 – present

Stations
 Charleroi, Belgium, 5 November 1944
 Vogelsang, Germany, 25 March 1945
 Limburg, Germany, 3 April 1945
 Eschwege, Germany, 12 April 1945
 France, 5–16 September 1945
 Drew Field, Florida, 20 September 1945
 MacDill Field, Florida, 20 September-21 December 1945
 Shaw Air Force Base, South Carolina, 1 January-25 June 1953
 Sembach Air Base, Germany, 7 July 1953
 Kaiserslautern, Germany, 13 August 1953 – 8 February 1958
 Buckley Air National Guard Base (later Buckley Air Force Base, Buckley Space Force Base), Colorado, 7 September 1993 – present

List of commanders

 Lt Col David Scanlon, 30 June 2009
 Lt Col Adam Stone, 24 June 2011
 Lt Col Chandler P. Atwood, July 2015 – July 2017
 Lt Col Creighton Mullins, July 2017 - June 2019
 Lt Col Ryan Skaggs, June 2019 - June 2021
 Lt Col James Nolan, June 2021

References

External links
 25th Air Force
 GlobalSecurity.org
 

Arapahoe County, Colorado
Military in Aurora, Colorado
0566
Military units and formations in Colorado